A few people have been given the epithet the Evil:

Arnulf, Duke of Bavaria (died 937), also called the Bad
Henry IV, Duke of Brunswick-Lüneburg (1463-1514)

See also
List of people known as the Good
List of people known as the Bad

Lists of people by epithet